{{Infobox deity
| type = Hindu
| deity_of = Goddess of the sky, consciousness, the past, the future, and fertility
| image = Lord Brahma and Adhiti - 19th Century Illustration.jpg
| caption = Aditi praying to the god Brahma
| affiliation = Devi, Devaki
| children = 
 Adityas, including Indra, Surya, Bhaga, Varuna, Mitra, Aryaman, Savitr, and Vamana
 Rudras
 Vasus

| texts = Rigveda, Puranas, Ramayana, Mahabharata| consort = Kashyapa
| mount = 
| weapons = Sword, Trishula| father = Daksha
| mother = Asikni
| name = Aditi
| siblings = Diti, Kadru, Vinata, Sati, Smriti Swaha, Rohini, Revati, Danu, Muni and many other brothers and sisters
}}
Aditi  (Sanskrit: अदिति, lit. 'boundless' or 'limitless' or 'innocence')  is an important Vedic goddess in Hinduism. 

She is the personification of the sprawling infinite and vast cosmos. She is the goddess of motherhood, consciousness, unconsciousness, the past, the future, and fertility. She is the mother of the celestial deities known as the adityas, and is referred to as the mother of many deities. As celestial mother of numerous beings, the synthesis of all things, she is associated with space (akasha) and with mystic speech (Vāc). She may be seen as a feminine form of Brahma, and associated with the primal substance (mulaprakriti) in the Vedanta. She is mentioned more than 250 times in the Rigveda, the verses replete with her praise.

 Family 
Aditi is the daughter of Daksha and Asikni (Panchajani). The Puranas, such as the Shiva Purana and the Bhagavata Purana, suggest that Daksha married all of his daughters off to different people, including Aditi and 12 others to Sage Kashyapa. When Kashyapa was living with Aditi and Diti in his ashrama, he was really pleased with Aditi's services, and told her to ask for a boon. Aditi prayed for one ideal son. Accordingly, Indra was born. Later, Aditi gave birth to the twelve adityas, namely Varuna, Parjanya, Mitra, Amsha, Pushan, Dhatri, Aryaman, Surya, Bhaga, Savitr, Vamana, and Viṣṇu. Her 16 younger sisters were also married to Sage Kashyapa.

 Origin 
The first mention of Aditi is found in Rigveda, which is dated by mainstream consensus to have been composed between 1800 and 1200 BC. She is portrayed as the mother of the Adityas, a group of societal Rigvedic deities, including Varuna, Mitra, Aryaman, Daksha, Bhaga, Amsha, and sometimes Surya and Savitar. As the mother of the societal deities, she represented the compliance to social behavior. Her motherhood was also an important attribute, and later was expanded so that she became the mother of all deities.

According to the Shatapatha Brahmana (a commentary on the Shukla Yajurveda), Aditi is also invoked during ritual sacrificial offerings as being synonymous with the Earth:

 Attributes 
Motherhood

Aditi and the sage Kashyapa had 33 sons, out of whom twelve are called Âdityas including Surya, eleven are called Rudras, and eight are called Vasus.
Aditi is said to be the mother of the great god Indra, the mother of kings (Mandala 2.27) and the mother of gods (Mandala 1.113.19). In the Vedas, Aditi is Devamata (mother of the celestial gods) as from and in her cosmic matrix all the heavenly bodies were born.

She is also the mother of the Vamana, avatar of Vishnu. Accordingly, the Vamana avatar, as the son of Aditi was born in the month of Shravana (fifth month of the Hindu Calendar, also called Avani) under the star Shravana. Many auspicious signs appeared in the heavens, foretelling the good fortune of this child.

In the Rigveda, Aditi is one of the most important figures of all. As a mothering presence, Aditi is often asked to guard the one who petitions her (Mandala 1.106.7; Mandala 8.18.6) or to provide him or her with wealth, safety, and abundance (Mandala 10.100; 1.94.15).

Creativity

Aditi is usually mentioned in the Rigveda along with other gods and goddesses. There is no one hymn addressed exclusively to her, unlike other Vedic gods. Since She is perhaps not related to a particular natural phenomenon like other gods. Compared to Ushas and Prithvi, Aditi can be defined as the cosmic creator.

The verse "Daksha sprang from Aditi and Aditi from Daksha" is seen by Theosophists as a reference to "the eternal cyclic re-birth of the same divine Essence" and divine wisdom.

Freedom
The name Aditi includes the root "da" (to bind or fetter) and suggests another attribute of her character. As A-diti, she is an unbound, free soul and it is evident in the hymns to her that she is often called to free the petitioner from different hindrances, especially sin and sickness. (Mandala 2.27.14). In one hymn, she is asked to free a petitioner who has been tied up like a thief (Mandala 8.67.14). As one who unbinds, her role is similar to her son Varuna's as guardian of Rta, cosmic moral order. She is called the supporter of creatures (Mandala 1.136).

Might
Aditi was attributed the status of first deity by the Vedic culture, although she is not the only one attributed this status in the Vedas. She is addressed in the Rigveda as "mighty" and revered as the eternal mother of all creation.

Others
Like many other Hindu gods and goddesses, Aditi has a vahana (a mount). Aditi flies across the boundless sky on a phoenix. The phoenix symbolizes strength, honour, but most importantly, reflects Aditi's nature of cyclical rebirth and infinite creation. 

Her weapons include the famous trishula,'' and a sword. 

Aditi is described to possess a pair of earrings, which are stolen from her by the asura named Naraka. Krishna returns the earrings to her after slaying the asura with his consort, Satyabhama.

Worship 
A well known old temple of Aditi is located near rock cut cave in Vizhinjam, Kerala.

See also 

 Payovrata
 Adityas
 Surya Namaskar
 Sun worship in Hinduism
 List of solar deities in Hinduism
 List of Surya temples
 List of Hindu deities
 List of Hindu pilgrimage sites
 List of Hindu temples

Notes

References

Further reading

External links 

 

Hindu goddesses
Fertility goddesses
Creator goddesses
Sky and weather goddesses
Daughters of Daksha